Eugenia Karagiannidou, better known as Eugenia Manolidou (Μανωλίδου) or Manolides, is a Greek classical composer, conductor, entertainment television presenter and is married to politician and Minister for Development and Investment of Greece Adonis Georgiadis.

Biography
Eugenia Karagiannidou was born on February 27, 1975, in Athens, Greece. Eugenia married painter Theodore Manolides, in 1995. They separated in 2002 but Theodore denied filing the divorce for quite a while. Afterward she lived with the editor, New Democracy party Vice President and former Minister Adonis Georgiades. She has given birth to 4 children, 2 of which with Theodore (Alexandros, 1996 and Olympia Theodora, 1998) and 2 with Adonis, called Perseus (2005) and Alcaeus (2014). Eventually Eugenia and Adonis got married on June 22, 2009.

Education and career as conductor
Eugenia Manolidou started piano lessons at the age of 5 and she kept practising all along, though her goal has always been composing. During her childhood, her father died. At some point, she paused her piano studies in Conservatory J.S. Bach, with Russian teacher Alla Halapsis. After graduation from high school, she began to study management but soon enough she pursued her dream overseas. In New York she managed to get accepted into the Juilliard School. She studied composition and orchestration with composer Daron Hagen as well as orchestral conducting with the founder of the New York Grand Opera Company, Vincent La Selva. At the same time, she resumed advanced piano studies with soloist Julie Jordan. Four years later, in 1998, she returned to Europe for postgraduate studies with Belgian composer and conductor Robert Janssens at the Royal Conservatory of Brussels.

TV career
Following her grand approval in the 2008 Beijing Olympic Concert Eugenia Manolidou decided to start a TV career. She was originally supposed to participate either as a judge for the 1st season of The X Factor (Greek TV series) or as the hostess of the legendary morning show Πρωινός Καφές i.e. "Morning Coffee". However, the broadcasting channel ANT1 thought it would be more intriguing for her to be hostess of the Greek version of The Moment of Truth (U.S. game show) reality show.

They turned out to be right as Moment of Truth in 2009 made a huge impact on the Greek audience and caused a lot of debate on how moral is for such programmes to be televised. As a matter of fact, political rivals of Eugenia's husband, Adonis Georgiades, took advantage of her media inexperience aiming at her and Adonis' ethics. Consequently, the National Radio & Television Broadcasting Council after the end of 1st season disallowed the show to carry on for a 2nd one. There is a major percentage of civilians criticizing her personality since then.

In first semester of 2010, Eugenia came back participating in 2 shows. She was the female judge of Ellada Eheis Talento (season 3) (Greece Got Talent) along with male judges Ilias Psinakis and Vangelis Perris. The host of the show was Hristos Ferentinos. Her different point of view on what is considered to be a talent, resulted in numerous arguments between the judges and heavy criticism from TV critics. In the end, it proved to be the most successful season of the show.

At the same time, Eugenia competed in the 1st season of Dancing with the Stars (Greek TV series) with pro-partner Elias Ladas. The intriguing part there was that she had to compete with Matthildi Maggira who replaced in Greece Got Talent. She performed remarkably well, gaining the audience's interest. Eugenia and Elias eventually got eliminated in the semi-final (3rd place). There were rumors that she was denied a final spot because she had already signed for her next step with rival TV channel Mega Channel. After 5 seasons of Dancing With The Stars in Greece, Eugenia is still considered to be in top-5 overall contestants, with several guest appearances in the show.

So, in the second semester of 2010, Eugenia Manolidou presented the 1st season of cooking show MasterChef Greece broadcast from Mega Channel, an adaptation of the original MasterChef (UK TV series) BBC show. The 3 judges were chefs Lefteris Lazarou, Giannis Loukakos and Dimitris Skarmoutsos. Although many predicted failure, MasterChef proved to be the most successful cooking show ever on Greek TV. Anticipation for the next episode grew larger and larger and the Big Final on December 28, 2010, has been an audience's measurement milestone. Master Chef was declared contestant Akis Petretzikis and he remains unique since 2nd season of MasterChef Greece never ended. Eugenia's spontaneous reaction on the winner announcement was never cut on editing and thus an urban slogan emerged: Θα καταρρεύσω i.e. I am about to collapse. She opted not to present either the Junior version or 2nd season despite proposals for both.

In 2011, Eugenia returned to ""ANT1" for the 4th season of Greece Got Talent, but due to financial reasons, the show was postponed for the next year. Meanwhile, she accepted to present Dancing With the Stars Daily, a programme based upon Strictly Come Dancing: It Takes Two from BBC that followed action of 2nd season of Dancing with the Stars (Greek TV series). DWTS Daily was eventually embedded in the morning infotainment programme of ANT1.

In 2012, Ellada Eheis Talento (season 4) was finally aired and Eugenia kept her position as the female judge. Unlike her, Ilias Psinakis could not return and Haris Hristopoulos took his place. There were not any arguments except some nasty contestants and everyone seemed to enjoy it. It was the final edition of the show till now as well as Eugenia's most recent job on TV.

Discography
 1999 – Meanings and Symbols:  Eugenia's first attempt to express her musical perception of 14 meaningful and symbolic myths of ancient Greece, “an infinite source of inspiration”, as the composer has often stated since. Primarily recorded in New York in 1998, her last year as a student in the Juilliard School, where she conducted a chamber music ensemble under the supervision of her professor Daron Hagen. A later recording in May 1999 with Bulgarian Symphony Orchestra SIF 309 was released in Greece from Kunduru Music/Universal. This album is not available anymore.
 2001 – Greek Hymns: Eugenia's second album presents a musical interpretation of 10 Orphic hymns. Recorded in Czech Republic with Filharmonie Bohuslava Martinů, soprano Hara Kefala, tenor Konstantinos Paliatsaras and choir. It was released in Greece by Als SA. It is no longer available.
 2004 – Archetypon (i.e. Original Model): Featuring Manolides' first symphony Mythical Couples plus 2 compositions of hers dedicated to her country and Alexander the Great. Mythical Couples is in fact a symphonic poem in 4 movements and was recorded back in October 1998 with Bulgarian Symphony Orchestra SIF 309. Both Hymn to Greece and Hymn to Alexander were recorded with Czech Filharmonie Bohuslava Martinů, soprano Hara Kefala and bass-baritone Tassos Apostolou.
 2004 – Gaia (i.e. Earth): Music of ballet in 2 acts Gaia which was recorded in September 1999 with Bulgarian Symphony Orchestra SIF 309 and staged the same year in Wuppertal.
 2007 – Epos (i.e. Logos): Epos technically is a lyric drama in 3 acts for full symphony orchestra, soloists, choir and narrator. It was recorded in 2005 in Athens with members of Athens State Orchestra, soprano Hara Kefala, tenor Konstantinos Paliatsaras, bass-baritone Tassos Apostolou, alto Nona Voudouri, baritone Theodoros Efstratiades, narrator George Spanopoulos and Polymnia vocalis as chorus. Ioannis Ganassos assisted Eugenia Manolidou in writing the lyrics.
 2003 to 2009 – Hercules: The real face of the great hero, Alexander the Great: The living legend, Iliad-Odyssey: A series of educational recordings for children with her husband depicting Greek history and mythology as fairytales with the use of music, narration and sound effects.

References

External links 
 EugeniaManolides.com
 Eugenia Manolidou | Practitioners' Voices in Classical Reception Studies | Open University
 

1975 births
Living people
20th-century classical composers
21st-century classical composers
20th-century conductors (music)
21st-century conductors (music)
20th-century Greek musicians
21st-century Greek musicians
20th-century Greek women
21st-century Greek women
Greek classical composers
Greek conductors (music)
Greek women classical composers
Greek women composers
Greek women musicians
Greek television presenters
Juilliard School alumni
Musicians from Athens
Spouses of Greek politicians
Women conductors (music)
Women television personalities
Greek women television presenters
20th-century women composers
21st-century women composers